Cryobacterium aureum is a Gram-positive, psychrophilic and rod-shaped bacterium from the genus Cryobacterium which has been isolated from glacier ice in China.

Characteristics
The name Cryobacterium aureum has been given on account of the bacteria being capable of survival at low temperatures (in this case, preferentially 8–14 °C) with colonies appearing with a  gold or canary yellow colour, similar to the naming of Staphylococcus aureus.  Cryobacterium aureum cells are motile, aerobic and approximately 0.9–1.6×0.4–0.6 µm in size.

References

Microbacteriaceae
Bacteria described in 2018